In mathematics, especially in homotopy theory, a left fibration of simplicial sets is a map that has the right lifting property with respect to the horn inclusions . A right fibration is one with the right lifting property with respect to the horn inclusions . A Kan fibration is one with the right lifting property with respect to every horn inclusion; hence, a Kan fibration is both a left and right fibration.

On the other hand, a left fibration is a coCartesian fibration and a right fibration a Cartesian fibration. In particular, category fibered in groupoids over another category is a special case of a right fibration of simplicial sets in the ∞-category setup.

References 

Ch. 2 of Lurie's Higher Topos Theory.

Simplicial sets